Alisto is a Philippine television public service show broadcast by GMA Network and GMA News TV. Hosted by Arnold Clavio, it premiered on GMA Network on March 23, 2013 on the network's Saturday evening line up replacing Kandidato. The show concluded on GMA Network on April 14, 2020. The show moved to GMA News TV on July 28, 2020 on the network's Power Block line up. The show returned to GMA Network on January 5, 2021. The show concluded on February 9, 2021. It was replaced by On Record in its timeslot.

Overview
The show features stories from actual videos of people in life-threatening situations. The program also has a regular segment exposing the latest modus operandi in crime as well as breaches in safety. It also features a road traffic segment hosted by Arianne Bautista as "Agent A".

Production
In March 2020, production was halted due to the enhanced community quarantine in Luzon caused by the COVID-19 pandemic. The show resumed its programming on July 28, 2020.

Ratings
According to AGB Nielsen Philippines' Mega Manila household television ratings, the pilot episode of Alisto earned a 7.9% rating.

Accolades

References

External links
 
 

2013 Philippine television series debuts
2021 Philippine television series endings
Filipino-language television shows
GMA Network original programming
GMA Integrated News and Public Affairs shows
GMA News TV original programming
Philippine television docudramas
Philippine television shows
Television productions suspended due to the COVID-19 pandemic